This list records the bishops of the Roman Catholic Diocese of Minden, a suffragan of the Archdiocese of Cologne, who were simultaneously rulers of princely rank (prince-bishop) in the Prince-Bishopric of Minden (est. 1180 and secularised in 1648), a state of imperial immediacy within the Holy Roman Empire. Minden was the seat of the chapter, the cathedral and residence of the bishops until 1305, Petershagen became the prince-episcopal residence since.

Titles of the incumbents of the Minden See 
In 1180 part of the Minden diocesan territory were disentangled from the Duchy of Saxony and became an own territory of imperial immediacy called Prince-Bishopric of Minden, a vassal of the Holy Roman Empire. The prince-bishopric was an elective monarchy, with the monarch being the respective bishop usually elected by the Minden Cathedral chapter, and confirmed by the Holy See, or exceptionally only appointed by the Holy See. Papally confirmed bishops were then invested by the emperor with the princely regalia, thus the title prince-bishop. However, sometimes the respective incumbent of the see never gained a papal confirmation, but was still invested the princely regalia. Also the opposite occurred with a papally confirmed bishop, never invested as prince. A number of incumbents, elected by the chapter, neither achieved papal confirmation nor imperial investiture, but as a matter of fact nevertheless de facto held the princely power. Between about 1555 to 1631 all incumbents were Lutherans. The respective incumbents of the see bore the following titles:
 Bishop of Minden until 1180
 Prince-Bishop of Minden from 1180 to 1554 and again 1631 to 1648
 Administrator of the Prince-Bishopric of Minden 1566 to 1630 and again 1631 to 1645. Either simply de facto replacing the Prince-Bishop or lacking canon-law prerequisites the incumbent of the see would officially only hold the title administrator (but nevertheless colloquially referred to as Prince-Bishop).

Catholic Bishops of Minden till 1180

Catholic Prince-Bishops (1180–1554)

Lutheran Prince-Bishop and Administrators of the Prince-Bishopric

Catholic Prince-Bishop (1631–1648)

Auxiliary bishops
Johann Christiani von Schleppegrell, O.S.A. (7 Jun 1428 to 8 Oct 1468)
Johannes Tideln, O.P. (7 Feb 1477 to 28 Jul 1501)
Ludwig von Siegen (bishop), O.F.M. (20 May 1502 to 13 Feb 1508)
Johannes Gropengeter, O.S.A. (9 Jan 1499 to 25 Jan 1508) 
Heinrich von Hattingen, O. Carm. (10 Dec 1515 to 1519)

Sources 
 Website Chronik Alt-Minden (retrieved on 29 April 2010) 
 "Liste der Bischöfe" on Lexikon des Mittelalters

Notes 

Bishops of Minden
Minden, Prince-Bishopric of
Minden